William Maher (born January 20, 1956) is an American comedian, writer, producer, political commentator, actor, and television host. He is known for the HBO political talk show Real Time with Bill Maher (2003–present) and the similar late-night show called Politically Incorrect (1993–2002), originally on Comedy Central and later on ABC. In 2022, Maher started the podcast Club Random.

Maher is known for his political satire and sociopolitical commentary. He targets many topics including religion, political correctness, and the mass media. His critical views of religion were the basis for his 2008 documentary film Religulous. He is a supporter of animal rights, having served on the board of PETA since 1997, and is an advisory board member of Project Reason. Maher supports the legalization of cannabis, serving on the advisory board of NORML.

In 2005, Maher ranked at number 38 on Comedy Central's 100 greatest stand-up comedians of all time. He received a Hollywood Walk of Fame star in 2010. Maher has earned 41 Primetime Emmy Award nominations and a win for his work as executive producer for Vice in 2014. He has also received nominations for two Grammy Awards, and a Tony Award.

Early life and education
Maher was born in New York City. His father, William Aloysius Maher Jr., was a network news editor and radio announcer, and his mother, Julie Maher (née Berman), was a nurse. He was raised in his Irish-American father's Roman Catholic religion. Until his early teens, he was unaware that his mother, whose family was from Hungary, was Jewish. Owing to his disagreement with the Catholic Church's doctrine about birth control, Maher's father stopped taking Maher and his sister to Catholic church services when Maher was thirteen.

Maher was raised in River Vale, New Jersey and graduated from Pascack Hills High School in Montvale in 1974. He then attended Cornell University, where he double-majored in English and history, and graduated in 1978. Maher has said, "Selling pot allowed me to get through college and make enough money to start off in comedy."

Career

Early career
Maher began his career as a comedian and actor. He was host of the New York City comedy club Catch a Rising Star in 1979. Maher began appearing on Johnny Carson's and David Letterman's shows in 1982. He made limited television appearances including on Sara (1985), Max Headroom (1987), Murder, She Wrote (1989, 1990), and Charlie Hoover (1991). His feature film debut was in D.C. Cab (1983). He later appeared in Ratboy (1986), House II: The Second Story (1987), Cannibal Women in the Avocado Jungle of Death (1988), Newhart (1988), hosted the talk show Midnight Hour on CBS (1990) and Pizza Man (1991).

Television career

Politically Incorrect with Bill Maher

Maher assumed the host role on Politically Incorrect with Bill Maher, a late-night political talk show that ran on Comedy Central from 1993 to 1997 and on ABC from 1997 to 2002. The show regularly began with a topical monologue by Maher preceding the introduction of four guests, usually a diverse group of individuals, such as show business, popular culture, political pundits, political consultants, authors, and occasionally news figures. The group would discuss topical issues selected by Maher, who also participated in the discussions. Jerry Seinfeld, a regular guest on the show, stated that Politically Incorrect reminded him of talk shows from the 1950s and '60s "when guests interacted with each other as much as with the host".

Politically Incorrect won an array of awards, including an Emmy Award for Outstanding Technical Direction, two CableACE awards for Best Talk Show Series, and a Genesis Award for Best Television Talk Show. Maher earned numerous award nominations for his producing, writing, and hosting of Politically Incorrect, including ten Emmy nominations, two TV Guide nominations, and two Writers Guild nominations. ABC decided against renewing Maher's contract for Politically Incorrect in 2002, after he made a controversial on-air remark six days after the September 11 attacks. He agreed with his guest, conservative pundit Dinesh D'Souza, that the 9/11 terrorists did not act in a cowardly manner (in rebuttal to President Bush's statement calling them cowards). Maher said, "We have been the cowards. Lobbing cruise missiles from 2,000 miles away. That's cowardly. Staying in the airplane when it hits the building. Say what you want about it. Not cowardly. You're right." Maher later clarified that his comment was not anti-military in any way whatsoever, referencing his well-documented longstanding support for the American military. After receiving complaints, FedEx and Sears pulled their advertisements from the show, costing the show significant revenue.

Maher's remarks after 9/11 were not the first time he had sparked controversy on Politically Incorrect. In the same year, he expressed his deep regrets and apologized after being widely criticized for comparing his dogs to mentally disabled children. The show was canceled on June 16, 2002, and the Sinclair Broadcast Group had dropped the show from its ABC-affiliated stations months prior. On June 22, 2002, just six days after the cancellation of Politically Incorrect, Maher received the Los Angeles Press Club president's award (for "championing free speech"). Maher was on the board of judges for the 2002 PEN/Newman's Own First Amendment Award, which included writer Vanessa Leggett, imprisoned for 168 days for protecting sources and research notes.

Real Time with Bill Maher

In 2003, Maher became the host, co-producer, and co-writer of Real Time with Bill Maher, a weekly hour-long political comedy talk show on the cable television network HBO. In 2016, HBO renewed Real Time through 2018, for its 15th and 16th seasons. During an interview, Maher told Terry Gross (on NPR's Fresh Air) that he much prefers having serious and well-informed guests on his program, as opposed to the random celebrities that fleshed out his roundtable discussions on Politically Incorrect.

As with his previous show, Politically Incorrect, Maher begins Real Time with a comic opening monologue based upon current events and other topical issues. He proceeds to a one-on-one interview with a guest, either in-studio or via satellite. Following the interview, Maher sits with two or three panelists, usually consisting of pundits, authors, activists, actors, politicians, and journalists, for a discussion of the week's events.

Real Time has earned widespread praise. It has been nominated for more than ten Primetime Emmy Awards and six Writer's Guild awards. In 2007, Maher and his co-producers were awarded the Television Producer of the Year Award in Variety Television by the Producers Guild of America. Maher holds the record for the most Emmy nominations without a win, having been nominated on 22 occasions and not winning once. Eleven of the nominations were for Politically Incorrect, while nine were for Real Time. The other two were nominations for two of his HBO comedy specials: I'm Swiss and Bill Maher: The Decider.

Notable responses to Real Time episodes

In late May 2005, Alabama Congressman Spencer Bachus sent a letter to Time Warner's board of directors requesting Real Time be canceled after remarks Maher made after noting the military had missed its recruiting goals by 42 percent. Bachus said he felt the comments were demeaning to the military and treasonous. Maher stated his highest regard and support for the troops and asked why the congressman criticized him instead of doing something about the recruitment problem.

On September 17, 2010, Maher aired a clip of Delaware Republican Senatorial candidate Christine O'Donnell from the October 29, 1999, episode of his old show Politically Incorrect on his current show Real Time with Bill Maher, where she mentioned that she had "dabbled in witchcraft". This was one of the most notable of numerous controversial statements by O'Donnell that made her the most covered candidate in the 2010 mid-term election cycle.

In February 2017, Maher interviewed Milo Yiannopoulos on Real Time regarding prior comments in which Yiannopolous seemed to express sympathy toward perpetrators of child sexual abuse. Although some fans and pundits initially criticized Maher for platforming the controversial pundit, ultimately the appearance brought more publicity to the comments and harmed Yiannopolous's career. In the days following the interview, Yiannopoulos had his invitation to speak before the 2017 Conservative Political Action Conference rescinded, as well as a book deal with Simon & Schuster cancelled. Yiannopoulos subsequently resigned as an editor at Breitbart News. When asked whether Yiannopoulos's interview on his show was among the causes of his resignation, Maher concurred, saying, "As I say, sunlight is the best disinfectant. You're welcome."

In 2019, during a "New Rules" segment of Real Time with Bill Maher, Maher stated that he questioned Stan Lee's legacy, that comic books are not literature, and that adult fans of comic books "need to grow up".

Political commentator
Maher is a frequent commentator on various cable news networks, including CNN, MSNBC, Fox News, and HLN. Maher has regularly appeared on CNN's The Situation Room with Wolf Blitzer and has also been a frequent guest on MSNBC's Hardball with Chris Matthews, The Rachel Maddow Show, and Countdown with Keith Olbermann. Maher has also appeared as a guest on HLN's The Joy Behar Show. He wrote the foreword for the 2002 book, Spin This!: All the Ways We Don't Tell the Truth by show host Bill Press.

Maher hosted the January 13, 2006, edition of Larry King Live, on which he was a frequent guest. Maher appeared as a special guest on the June 29, 2010, edition of the show, on which CNN anchor Larry King announced his retirement. Maher co-emceed the final show of Larry King Live on December 16, 2010, with Ryan Seacrest.

Other work
In 2004, Maher appeared on stage as Satan in The Steve Allen Theater production of "Hollywood Hell House", a spoof of Christian-run hell houses. The show was a faithful reproduction of an evangelistic scare-experience written by Reverend Keenan Roberts to terrify teenagers into declaring themselves Christians. "Our faith is that putting this up as itself, it will hoist itself on its own petard, that it's comical just as it is," explained producer Maggie Rowe. The show featured a rotating cast of over 160 celebrities, including Andy Richter (Jesus), Richard Belzer, Dave Thomas, Traci Lords, Craig Bierko, Sarah Silverman, and Julia Sweeney.

Maher and director Larry Charles teamed up to make the movie Religulous, described by trade publication Variety as a documentary "that spoofs religious extremism across the world". It was released on October 3, 2008.

In 2013, Maher became one of the executive producers for the HBO newsmagazine series Vice. Also in 2013, Maher appeared on The Tonight Show with Jay Leno and offered to pay $5 million to a charity if Donald Trump would produce his birth certificate to prove that Trump's mother had not mated with an orangutan. Maher said this reportedly in response to Trump having previously challenged President Barack Obama to produce his birth certificate, and having offered $5 million payable to a charity of Obama's choice if Obama would produce his college applications, transcripts, and passport records.

In response to Maher's offer, Trump produced his birth certificate, and then Trump launched a lawsuit after Maher was not forthcoming, claiming that Maher's $5 million offer was legally binding. "I don't think he was joking", Trump said. "He said it with venom." Trump withdrew his lawsuit against the comedian after eight weeks.

On May 13, 2016, Maher and his friend Michael Moore announced on YouTube that they are going to make a movie called The Kings of Atheism.

On March 21, 2022, Maher launched a podcast titled Club Random, a series hosting one-on-one interviews with guests, recorded in his bar at home, where he discusses everything except politics. Guest have included Quentin Tarantino, Jimmy Kimmel, Bella Thorne, Judd Apatow, Mike Tyson, Killer Mike, and William Shatner.

Political views

Maher often eschews political labels, referring to himself as "practical". He identifies as liberal and stands against political correctness. In his words, "The difference is that liberals protect people, and P.C. people protect feelings." In the past, he has also described himself as a libertarian, and has also referred to himself "as a progressive, as a sane person". In a 2012 panel discussion with Salman Rushdie, Maher counted himself, Rushdie, and others such as Christopher Hitchens and Sam Harris as "9/11 liberals", noting that they differentiate themselves from many mainstream liberals in saying that not all religions are alike and that they are not bigoted in criticizing a particular religion. He said in a later interview: "It's ridiculous to label criticism of a religion as a phobia of a religion. I'm going to criticize any person or group that violates liberal principles...."

Maher favors the ending of corporate welfare and federal funding of non-profits; he also favors the legalization of gambling, prostitution, and cannabis. Maher also supports the death penalty.

Maher describes himself as an environmentalist, and he has spoken in favor of the Kyoto treaty on global warming on his show Real Time. He often criticizes industry figures involved in environmental pollution. He is a board member of People for the Ethical Treatment of Animals. The comedian has noted the paradox of people claiming they distrusted "elite" politicians while at the same time wanting elite doctors to treat them and elite lawyers to represent them in court.

Maher has been critical of the #MeToo movement, describing it in February 2018 as McCarthyism. He has supported Chris Matthews against allegations of sexual harassment in 2020.

Candidates and endorsements 
Despite being a member of the Democratic Party, Maher has voted for Bob Dole and Ralph Nader. Maher also considers himself to be at odds with both the Republican Party and the Democratic Party.

In the 2008 U.S. presidential election, Maher announced his support for U.S. Senator Barack Obama (D-IL). Although Maher welcomed Obama's electoral victory, he soon became critical of the new president for not acting more boldly on health care reform and other progressive issues. On February 23, 2012, after his "Crazy Stupid Politics" special streamed on Yahoo! Screen, Maher announced that he was contributing $1 million to Priorities USA, the Obama SuperPAC.

In the leadup to the 2014 midterm elections, Maher conducted a "Flip a District" contest on his HBO show. His audience was asked to select one "terrible, entrenched" member of Congress in a close election race—"the loserest loser of all"—to remove from office. Maher aimed to help oust that representative by shining a "national spotlight" on the politician during segments of his show and stand-up comedy appearances in that member's district during the Fall election. Maher ultimately selected Republican Representative John Kline from Minnesota's 2nd congressional district, but he failed to prevent him from winning against his Democratic-Farmer-Labor Party opponent Mike Obermueller.

In the 2016 U.S. presidential election, Maher initially endorsed Senator Bernie Sanders on February 5, 2016. Maher later announced his support for Hillary Clinton after Clinton won the nomination from the Democratic Party primary elections in June 2016. In October 2016, Maher criticized WikiLeaks founder Julian Assange for publishing leaks from the DNC's emails, saying: "I really feel like he's lost his way a little, and he hates Hillary." On March 31, 2017, following her defeat, Maher responded on air to suggestions Clinton was ready to end her low profile and speak out: "Hillary, stay in the woods. Okay. You had your shot. You f*cked it up. You're Bill Buckner. We had the World Series, and you let the grounder go through your legs. Let someone else have the chance." In August 2019, Maher said an economic recession would be "worth it" if Donald Trump does not get re-elected in 2020. He said: "We have survived many recessions. We can't survive another Donald Trump term."

Over the course of 20 different editions of Real Time with Bill Maher broadcast between April 13, 2018, and August 7, 2020 and in several press interviews, Maher predicted that Donald Trump would refuse to concede any loss in the 2020 United States presidential election, dedicating a 'New Rules' end segment to the subject on January 25, 2020. Maher highlighted Trump's own public references to Maher's assertions that Trump was "not going to leave", and quoted Trump's March 14, 2019, assertion that "I have the support of the police, the military, the bikers [for Trump]" and "the tough people", citing this as evidence that Trump would seek to remain in office by force. Maher predicted there would be violence by armed Trump supporters attempting to keep Trump in power and criticized Democratic Party politicians for not taking the threat seriously:"So my question to all Democratic candidates is: what's the plan? If you win, and the next day he claims he's voiding the election because of irregularities he's hearing about, what do you do? What do you do when the crowd that was in Virginia this week, 22,000 strong, marches on Washington? This is a scary moment. And when I've asked Democrats, 'What do we do if he doesn't go?', their answer is always some variation of 'We have to win big!'... First of all, NO! No, we don't have to win by a landslide! Jesus, fucking Democrats! I am so sick of Democrats volunteering to play by two different sets of rules. That's the new paradigm? Republicans can win by one vote, but we're not legitimate unless it's a landslide? Fuck. And two, do you really think it would matter if it was? That they would suddenly get rational about math and facts? They believe Hillary ran a pedophile ring out of a pizza parlor!"Maher later said in an August 15, 2020, interview with Vanity Fair that "we've baked it into the cake that he's not going to leave." In the September 25, 2020, edition of Real Time, Maher criticized the framing of a New York Times story by Michael Crowley headlined "Trump Won't Commit to Peaceful Transfer of Power", which ran on page 15 of the print edition of the paper. Maher asserted that, "I got no help from the New York Times, Washington Post, [or] CNN", adding that the media "should have amplified" the severity of Trump's threats that he would refuse to concede or commit to a peaceful transition of power.

In January 2022, Maher declined to run in the 2024 United States presidential election following speculation by Dana Perino that he may be called on to do so.

Religion

Maher is highly critical of all religion and views it as highly destructive. He has been described, or self-identified, variously as an agnostic, atheist, and apatheist, while objecting to having his views defined by a single label. In his 2008 feature film Religulous, he refers to himself as agnostic. He has rejected being grouped with explicit atheists, saying in 2002, "I'm not an atheist. There's a really big difference between an atheist and someone who just doesn't believe in religion. Religion to me is a bureaucracy between man and God that I don't need, but I'm not an atheist, no."

Maher has occasionally referred to himself as an apatheist, saying in 2011 "I don't know what happens when you die, and I don't care." When discussing his apatheism and his views on the existence of God, he said on a scale from 1 to 7 (7 being "absolutely certain there is no god"), he was only at 6.9, like Richard Dawkins, "because we just don't know ... but we just don't think about it." He added, "There's atheist and there's agnostic, and I'm okay with us not splitting the difference on those; if you are just not a super-religious person, you are on my team." Several months later on a 2012 episode of his HBO show, Maher declared that "idiots must stop claiming that atheism is a religion ... believe it or not, I don't really enjoy talking about religion all the time. In fact, not only is atheism not a religion, it's not even my hobby, and that's the best thing about being an atheist. It requires so little of your time." He has reiterated his stance during other interviews, rejecting both the certitude of the existence, as well as the certitude of nonexistence of deities, concluding, "I'm saying that doubt is the only appropriate response for human beings."

While critical of all organized religions, saying "they're all stupid and dangerous", Maher says all religions are not alike, and has drawn comparisons and contrasts between them. He has said, "By any standard, Mormonism is more ridiculous than any other religion." He has referred to tenets of Judaism as "insane" and "funny", and has said Buddhism "includes crazy whack shit that doesn't exist, that somebody made up, like reincarnation". He has described Christianity and Islam as more "warlike", and has asserted that, like historic Christianity, present-day Islam needs to undergo its own reformation and enlightenment.

In defense of his criticism of Islam, Sharia law and Muslim culture, Maher says he "believes in the values that Western people believe in that a lot of the Muslim world does not. Like separation of church and state. Like equality of the sexes. Like respect for minorities, free elections, free speech, freedom to gather. These things are not just different from cultures that don't have them.... It's better ... I would like to keep those values here."

Citing studies and poll results by Pew Research Center, the World Economic Forum and others, Maher says the human rights violations and "illiberal ideas" found in Islam are not extremist views held by a small minority but are supported by a majority of citizens in Muslim countries. Maher has criticized liberals as hypocritical for defending these core liberal values and ideals only at home, while not condemning the oppression of these values and groups in Muslim culture. Regarding the more recent publicity generated by his stance in the ongoing debate, Maher says he thinks people are finally paying closer attention to a conversation that they need to have. "I'm just shining a light on the reality of the situation. I don't even understand why this is so controversial."

Maher received the 2009 Richard Dawkins Award from Atheist Alliance International. He was an advisory board member of author Sam Harris's Project Reason, a foundation that promotes scientific knowledge and secular values within society.

National security 
On June 7, 2013, Maher expressed on his show limited support for the NSA's PRISM intelligence data collection from private phone calls and the Internet, saying that the threat of terrorists obtaining and using nuclear weapons was the tipping point for him. While he stated that he trusted the Obama administration to employ the program responsibly, he described the NSA's access to private data as a "slippery slope", and worried about whether other politicians would be as responsible.

Since the 9/11 attacks, he has endorsed certain uses of profiling at airports, saying that "Places like Israel, where they have faced terrorism for a long time, of course understand that profiling is part of all detective work. It's part of all police work. If they stop calling it profiling and start calling it high-intelligence screening or something, people would go, it's about time."

Maher opposed Trump's Executive Order 13769, an order which banned entry into the US of citizens from five majority-Muslim countries and has hosted multiple guests, including Sam Harris and Jim Jefferies, on his show who have also opposed the order.

Foreign policy 
In 2015, Maher criticized Barack Obama's visit to Saudi Arabia, a close U.S. ally, saying: "Stop respecting their medieval bullshit under the guise of, 'It's their culture.'" Maher opposed the Iraq War from the beginning and has summarized his opinion by saying that the United States and the world have had to pay too high a price for the war. He is skeptical of Iraq surviving without civil war.

On the Israeli–Palestinian conflict, Maher says he is "more on the side of the Israelis" and does not consider both sides equally guilty. He acknowledges that "Palestinians do have gripes", and he has been critical of U.S. financial aid to Israel, saying "they don't need our money, they can handle it themselves." Maher also notes that most Israelis would prefer a two-state solution and oppose the hard-line stance of their Israeli government, which he describes as having been taken over by their version of the Tea Party. However, Maher has defended Israel's military actions against Palestinian militants amid criticism over civilian deaths and disproportionate casualty count between Israelis and Palestinians during the 2014 Gaza war. He argues that Israel is still showing restraint, and he finds it ironic that the same people who were incredulous over how the Jews in World War II were led "to their slaughter", can't understand why they are defending themselves now. Maher faced online backlash for tweeting that "Dealing w/ Hamas is like dealing w/ a crazy woman who's trying to kill u - u can only hold her wrists so long before you have to slap her" at the start of the war. In August 2019, Maher denounced the anti-Israel Boycott, Divestment and Sanctions, saying: "It's predicated on this notion ... I think it's very shallow thinking that the Jews in Israel are mostly white and Palestinians are mostly brown, so they must be innocent and correct and the Jews must be wrong." He responded to Rep. Rashida Tlaib's call to boycott his talk show: "Some people have one move only: boycott. Cancel. Make-go-away. But here's the thing, the house voted 318 to 17 to condemn the #BDS movement, including 93% of Dems. Does Tlaib want to boycott 93% of her own party?".

In April 2020, Maher criticized those who equated using the term "Wuhan virus" with racism, stating, "Scientists...have been naming diseases after the places they came from for a very long time. Zika is from the Zika Forest, Ebola from the Ebola River, hantavirus the Hantan River. There's the West Nile virus and Guinea worm and Rocky Mountain spotted fever and, of course, the Spanish flu." He added: "This has nothing to do with Asian Americans, and it has everything to do with China."

In March 2021, Maher criticized China's treatment of Uyghur minority in Xinjiang. He said the United States has "lost" to China in the "battle for the 21st century". According to Maher, China is dominating the world while United States is wasting time in a "never-ending woke competition".

Race 

In June 2017, Maher came under criticism for saying "I'm a house nigger" on Real Time with calls being made by people to HBO to fire him. Following the episode, HBO sent a statement to media outlets, calling Maher's remarks "inexcusable and tasteless" and said the cable network will remove that segment from future airings of the show. Maher also issued a statement apologizing for the remarks. Maher apologized on his show and had a discussion with Michael Eric Dyson, Ice Cube, and Symone Sanders about the controversy.

In 2022, Maher criticized the Democratic Party for "checking boxes" in regards to candidates of different identity groups, including race. He stated that Democrats prioritize "diversity" over "merit". Maher has also spoken out against critical race theory but supports teaching the history of racism.

Immigration 
In November 2015, Maher expressed opposition to the United States accepting Syrian refugees. Maher argued that they have different values which are at odds with American values due to some refugees may be coming from places which are governed by Sharia law or want to be. Maher cited cases in the UK where Muslim immigrants had carried out female genital mutilation and honor killings. In 2021, after the withdrawal of U.S. troops from Afghanistan, Maher urged America to take in Afghan refugees. Maher has criticized Donald Trump's opposition to immigration, including his proposed border wall on the southern border and accused Trump of hypocrisy, having himself married two immigrants. Maher has also accused Republicans of hypocrisy for opposing immigration and praising their immigrant parents, saying "You can't spend the first half of a debate bitching about how immigrants are ruining the country and the second half on the uplifting stories of your immigrant parents."

Maher has criticized Democrats' approach to immigration and has praised Canada's system, saying "Canada is much more to the right on immigration. You have to have a skill. That's mostly what it's based on. Ours is mostly based on family."

Gun rights and hunting rights 
Maher endorsed a 2014 Maine referendum to ban the use of bait, traps and dogs to hunt bears in Maine. He specifically criticized the use of bait, referring to its use as "nothing but an execution".

Maher is a gun owner, and explained in his February 12, 2013, appearance on the late-night TV talk show Conan that he owns guns for personal home protection. However, he does not identify himself as a "proud" gun owner, commenting that being a proud gun owner is akin to "saying I'm a 'proud remote control owner. Maher has stated that statistics showing that gun owners are more likely to harm a member of their household are caused by irresponsible gun owners, and believes that tragedies such as school shootings will not lead to a fundamental change in gun laws because both Democrats and Republicans favor guns. Maher has also questioned the need to own large arsenals of guns. He believes the Second Amendment is "bullshit" and said that bipartisan background check legislation proposed by Pat Toomey and Joe Manchin was “so marginal". In 2022, Maher blamed mass shooting in part due to Hollywood romanticization of gun violence in movies.

Health care
Maher supports the establishment of a Medicare-for-All universal single-payer health care system, and has consistently agreed with the proposal since 2011. Maher has stated that the American Medical Association is a powerful lobbying group and one of the primary reasons why the United States had failed to enact health care reform in the decades prior to the passage of the Affordable Care Act. On the topic of getting the Affordable Care Act passed, in 2009 Maher stated that Obama should forget about trying to get 60 votes for it because "he only needs 51": "Forget getting the sixty votes or sixty percent—sixty percent of people don't believe in evolution in this country—he just needs to drag them to it, like I said, they're stupid; get health care done, with or without them." On Fox News in a televised debate with Bill O'Reilly, Maher said that "if Jesus was in charge of the country we'd probably have health care for everybody."

Maher has expressed the view that a lot of illness is the result of poor diet and lack of exercise, and that medicine is often not the most appropriate way of addressing illness. In an episode of his show about the 2008 presidential candidates' health plans, Maher stated that poor nutrition is a primary cause of illness, and that "the answer isn't another pill." He also has said: "If you believe you need to take all the pills the pharmaceutical industry says you do, then you're already on drugs!" He has expressed his distaste for the pharmaceutical and health care industries in general, on the grounds that they make their money out of treating people who are made sick by consuming unhealthy food that corporations push on the public. He maintains that mass consumption of high-fructose corn syrup is a contributor to the rise in frequency of obesity in the United States.

In a discussion with Michael Moore about the film Sicko, Maher said, "The human body is pretty amazing; it doesn't get sick, usually, for no reason. I mean, there's some genetic stuff that can get to you, but, basically, people are sick in this country because they're poisoned. The environment is a poisoning factor, but also, we gotta say, they poison themselves. They eat shit. People eat shit, and that's, to my way of thinking, about 90 percent of why people are sick, is because they eat shit."

Tara Parker-Pope and former Senator (R-TN) Bill Frist, a physician, have called his criticism of the H1N1 flu vaccinations unscientific. Infectious diseases expert Paul Offit has written that misinformation about vaccines from celebrities like Maher has put children at unnecessary risk. Offit says that celebrities like Maher are seen as "less credible" and would still be considered just "great entertainment" if they weren't joined by the former Director of the National Institutes of Health, Bernadine Healy and influential pediatrician, Robert Sears.

Surgical Oncologist David Gorski criticized Maher's claims about vaccines several times on ScienceBlogs, and when Maher received the Richard Dawkins Award in 2009, Gorski wrote it was inappropriate. Skeptics, including magician and popular science writer Martin Gardner, neurologist Steven Novella, and magician Jamy Ian Swiss have also strongly rebuked Maher, characterizing him as anti-science, uninformed and potentially endangering the health of fans who take his "non-medical" advice. Maher responded to the criticism, saying, "What I've read about what they think I'm saying is not what I've said. I'm not a germ theory denier. I believe vaccinations can work. Polio is a good example. Do I think in certain situations that inoculating Third World children against malaria or diphtheria, or whatever, is right? Of course. In a situation like that, the benefits outweigh costs. But to me living in Los Angeles? To get a flu shot? No." In 2019, Gorski again criticized Maher's HBO interview with the doctor Jay Gordon and Maher's claims about vaccines (in particular, the influenza vaccine), spreading out vaccinations and the possibility of a link between vaccines and autism, which is debunked according to consensus science.

In January 2021, Maher promoted the COVID-19 lab leak theory. On April 16, 2021, Maher called media coverage of the COVID-19 pandemic "panic porn" and added that "When all of our sources for medical information have an agenda to spin us, yeah, you wind up with a badly misinformed population, including on the left."

Cannabis legalization
Maher, who has a California medical marijuana card, openly and publicly uses cannabis and has been a visible supporter of cannabis law reform. Maher is a member of the advisory boards for both the NORML and Marijuana Policy Project, organizations that support regulated legalization of cannabis. He sold cannabis while in college at Cornell and credits it for making his college and the beginning of his career as a comic possible. In 2015, Maher called on then President Barack Obama to pardon people incarcerated for marijuana offenses and later praised President Joe Biden for pardoning citizens convicted of marijuana offenses. He has been called "one of the brightest torches for sensible marijuana policy" and "a contemporary cannabis statesman".

Conspiracy theories 
Maher has been a critic of 9/11 conspiracy theories. On October 19, 2007, Maher confronted several 9/11 truthers and had them ejected from his show audience after they interrupted the live show numerous times by calling out from the audience. The incident drew significant media attention and praise from Fox News talk show host and frequent critic John Gibson.

Maher has spoken out against QAnon and the conspiracy theories they have promoted. Maher has criticized the decision to ban conspiracy theorist Alex Jones from Twitter saying "I don't like Alex Jones, but Alex Jones gets to speak. Everybody gets to speak."

Other 
In May 2022, Maher suggested that more people are identifying as LGBT because "it's trendy." Maher also referred to puberty blockers and other transgender health care for trans youth as "literally experimenting on children".

Maher has been critical of the #MeToo movement, describing it in February 2018 as McCarthyism. He has supported Chris Matthews against allegations of sexual harassment in 2020.

Influences
Maher has said his influences include Lenny Bruce, Woody Allen, Steve Allen, Johnny Carson, Robert Klein, and George Carlin.

Comedians who have said they were influenced by Maher include Chris Rock and Seth MacFarlane.

Awards and nominations

Maher has received 41 Primetime Emmy Award nominations winning for Outstanding Informational Series or Special for Vice in 2015. He also received two Grammy Award nominations and various Producers Guild of America Award and Writers Guild of America Award nominations.

Maher was honored by High Times as "Top Pot Comic in 2006" and Real Time won a Stony Award in 2006 for "Best Cable News Show". High Times later designated him as "Stoner of the Year".

Personal life

Maher has never married. Regarding marriage, Maher is quoted on his website as saying, "I'm the last of my guy friends to have never gotten married, and their wives—they don't want them playing with me. I'm like the escaped slave—I bring news of freedom."

In 2003, he began dating former Playboy Cyber Girl Coco Johnsen. In November 2004, at the end of their 17-month relationship, Johnsen sued Maher for US$9 million for "pain and suffering" for alleged "insulting, humiliating and degrading racial comments". Her suit stated that Maher promised to marry her and father her children, support her financially and buy a house in Beverly Hills. Johnsen's suit also alleged that she quit her job as a flight attendant and occasional model to be with him. Maher's lawyers in their response, filed on November 23, 2004, in Los Angeles County Superior Court said Maher is a "confirmed bachelor, and a very public one at that" who "never promised to marry [Johnsen] or to have children with her". Maher's filing stated that, after the relationship had ended, Johnsen "launched a campaign to embarrass, humiliate, and extort ridiculous sums of money from Bill Maher". Johnsen had previously accused another former boyfriend of rape and kidnapping in 1997, and the charges were later dismissed for lack of evidence. The lawsuit was dismissed on May 2, 2005.

In 2005, Maher began dating Karrine Steffans, author and former hip hop model.

When commentators suggested there was a pattern to his dating because both his girlfriend and former girlfriend were black, Maher said, "People say I'm into black women. Robert De Niro is into black women. I'm just into women who are real, and they happen to be black." From 2009 to 2011, Maher dated former adjunct professor, science educator, and current Skeptics' Guide to the Universe co-host Cara Santa Maria. Since 2014, Maher has dated Ontario born singer Anjulie Persaud.

In 2012, Maher purchased a minority ownership interest in the New York Mets.

Bibliography
 True Story: A Novel, 1994
 Does Anybody Have a Problem With That? Politically Incorrect's Greatest Hits, 1996
 Does Anybody Have a Problem with That? The Best of Politically Incorrect, 1997
 When You Ride Alone You Ride with bin Laden: What the Government Should Be Telling Us to Help Fight the War on Terrorism, 2003
 Keep the Statue of Liberty Closed: The New Rules, 2004
 New Rules: Polite Musings from a Timid Observer, 2005
 The New New Rules: A Funny Look at How Everybody but Me Has Their Head Up Their Ass, 2011

Filmography

Film

Television

See also
 List of animal rights advocates

References

External links

 
 
 
 
  in 2004
 
 
 

 
1956 births
Living people
20th-century American comedians
20th-century American male actors
20th-century American non-fiction writers
20th-century atheists
21st-century American comedians
21st-century American male actors
21st-century American non-fiction writers
21st-century atheists
American atheists
Jewish American atheism activists
American cannabis activists
American critics of Islam
American libertarians
American male comedians
American male film actors
American male television actors
American male non-fiction writers
American male television writers
American media critics
American people of Irish descent
American people of Hungarian-Jewish descent
American political commentators
American satirists
American social commentators
American stand-up comedians
American television talk show hosts
American television writers
American animal rights activists
Childfree
Comedians from New Jersey
Comedians from New York City
Cornell University alumni
Critics of creationism
Criticism of journalism
Critics of religions
Critics of Christianity
Critics of Judaism
Critics of conspiracy theories
Jewish agnostics
Journalists from New York City
Journalists from California
Late night television talk show hosts
Left-libertarians
Liberalism in the United States
Male actors from New Jersey
Male actors from New York City
Pascack Hills High School alumni
People from River Vale, New Jersey
Primetime Emmy Award winners
Screenwriters from California
Screenwriters from New York (state)
Television producers from New York City
Writers from New Jersey
Writers from New York City
20th-century American male writers
21st-century American male writers
Television producers from New Jersey